Jock Rock, Volume 1 is the first album in the Jock Rock compilation album series, released in 1994. The following year, it was certified gold in the United States.

Track listing
"And the home of the..."
"We Will Rock You" – Queen
"Charge"
"Blitzkrieg Bop" – The Ramones
"Rock and Roll (Part 2)" – Gary Glitter
"Let's Go!"
"Mony Mony" – Tommy James and the Shondells
"Shotgun" – Junior Walker & the All Stars
"He Shoots! He Scores!"
"I Got You (I Feel Good)" – James Brown
"Who Wants a Hot Dog?"
"Tequila" – The Champs	
"Make Some Noise"
"Dance to the Music" – Sly and the Family Stone
"Born to Be Wild" – Steppenwolf
"Dee-fense!"
"What I Like About You" – The Romantics
"Shout!" – The Isley Brothers
"Takin' Care of Business" – Bachman-Turner Overdrive
"Three Point Goal!"
"Bang the Drum All Day" – Todd Rundgren
"Na Na Hey Hey Kiss Him Goodbye" – Steam
"And That's The End of the Ballgame"
"SportsCenter Theme ("Da Da Da")

Charts

Weekly charts

Year-end charts

References

1994 debut albums
Jock series
1994 compilation albums
Rock compilation albums
Dance music compilation albums
Tommy Boy Records compilation albums